Maxwell House Show Boat was the top radio show in the United States from 1933 to 1935. The program was sponsored by Maxwell House coffee, and it aired on NBC Radio Thursday nights, 9 pm. The first show was broadcast in 1931.

Maxwell House Show Boat was inspired by the success of the Jerome Kern-Oscar Hammerstein II musical Show Boat, which was based on the novel of the same name by Edna Ferber. It became an instant classic when it opened in 1927 on Broadway. The radio program starred Charles Winninger as Captain Henry, a role directly inspired by Winninger's stage performance as Cap'n Andy Hawks, owner of the showboat Cotton Blossom in the Kern-Hammerstein musical. (Otherwise, the Maxwell House program and the stage Show Boat had nothing to do with each other besides the fact that both had a Mississippi showboat as a setting for the action.) In 1932, the year before Maxwell House Show Boat premiered, Winninger reprised his role as Cap'n Andy in the first stage revival of Kern and Hammerstein's Show Boat, a role he would once again play in the 1936 film version of the musical.

Cast
Lanny Ross, master of ceremonies
Charles Winninger
Annette Hanshaw (1932-1934)

See also
List of most-listened-to radio programs

References

1930s American radio programs
NBC radio programs